Skarżyński (feminine: Skarżyńska; plural: Skarżyńscy) is a Polish surname and a family of Belarusian noble origin. The Skarżyńskis lived in Trakai Voivodeship, Lithuania. They lived in the folwark estate in Kamenka near Ashmyany, Belarus. The family set forth a detailed history of the members of family for the purpose of establishing themselves in the nobility at the Ashmyany City Court. The Skarżyńskis also owned land in Paszkiszki village, Grodno Region,Belarus. The Skarżyńskis also had a strong presence in Vilnius Region, Lithuania. The Skarżyńskis also owned land in Kherson Governorate, Ukraine. The Skarzhynskis also had branches in Poltava and Chernihiv. Other Skarzynski branches have origins in Germany. The family has a history of nobility in Poland, Lithuania, Ukraine, Russia, and Belarus. 

In 1820, the Vilnius herald recognized several of the Skarżyńskis "as native and ancient Polish nobility", bringing their names to the first part of the gubernial books of nobility. In 1844, the Vilnius herald recorded in the Trakai district Ignacy other members of the Skarżyński family. The paternal members of the family are also descendants of the R1a Slavic branch of the Kievan Rus Rurikid Dynasty.

Origin and history of the family
The family has roots in Rypin, Sierpc, Gójsk, and Szczutowo in Poland. Jan Skarzynski founded Skarzyn, Masovian Voivodeship.
Other family members have roots in Saint Petersburg, Russia and Moscow, Russia. Marcin Skarżyński, in the 1600s, owned a lot of land in Trakai District, Lithuania. The family has a deep military tradition serving both Poland and the Russian Empire with some family members being highly ranked and highly decorated as well. The Skarżyński family produced at least four high-ranking generals that served Poland and the Russian Empire. General Pyotr Mikhailovich Skarzhinsky would be decorated with the  Order of St. Vladimir of the 2nd degree and the Order of St. George of the 4th degree which was the high military decoration of the Russian Empire. General Ambroży Mikołaj Skarżyński would become a legendary general under French military and political leader Napoleon Bonaparte. He received a hereditary title of a Baron of the French Empire in 1814, which was later confirmed by the Polish parliament in 1820.

The ancestors of this family owned an immovable estate in the Trotsky Voivodeship (1628) and were awarded various ranks by Polish kings for their services. Anthony-Alexander Skarzhinsky, who came from this family, entered the Russian service (1733) and, when he converted to the Orthodox faith, was called Mikhail.

Skarżyński, who settled in the Rav Voivodeship. Of these, Alexander, Lovčij Brzezinski, owned the estates of Studzenice and Laziska (from 1755). Yuri Skarzhinsky, podstarosta Sochaczewski, was granted (1790) a knight of the Order of St. Stanislaus.

Notable people
 Ambroży Mikołaj Skarżyński (1787–1868), Polish general
 Bolesław Skarżyński (1901–1963), Polish biologist
 Henryk Skarżyński (born 1954), Polish otolaryngologist
 Hilary Skarżyński (1925–1987), Polish ice hockey player
 Jerzy Skarżyński (athlete) (born 1956), Polish athlete
 Jerzy Skarżyński (1924–2004), Polish artist and stage designer
 Krystyna Skarżyńska (psychologist), Polish professor, psychologist
 Krystyna Skarżyńska (born 1934), Polish professor, surveying engineer
 Stanisław Skarżyński (1899–1942), Polish military officer and aviator
 Stanisław Jan Skarżyński (1897–1920), Polish pilot
 Teresa Skarżyńska (1884–1957), Polish social activist and resistance fighter
   Nikolai Petrovich Skarzhinsky, Russian lieutenant of the Izmailovsky Life Guards Regiment, mortally wounded at the Battle of Kulm (August 17, 1813); his name is listed on the wall of the Cathedral of Christ the Savior in Moscow
   Yuri Skarzhinsky, Russian granted (1790) a knight of the Order of St. Stanislaus
   Skorzhinsky, Dmitry Grigorievich (1636-1677), Moscow nobleman.
   Skorzhinsky, Pyotr Grigoryevich, Moscow nobleman (1640), stolnik (1686). 
   Skarzhinsky, Pyotr Mikhailovich- Russian Major General, Holder of the Order of St. Vladimir of the 2nd degree and the Order of St. George of the 4th degree. Commander of the Astrakhan Cossack Regiment. He participated in the Russo-Turkish War of 1768-1774 and the Russo-Turkish War of 1787-1791.
   Skarzhinsky, Nikolai Petrovich, Russian Lieutenant of the Izmailovo regiment, mortally wounded at Kulm (August 17, 1813), his name is listed on the wall of the Cathedral of Christ the Savior in Moscow. 
   Skarzhinsky, Anthony-Alexander, Russian 1st Lubensky Regiment. 
   Skarzhinsky, Mikhail Mikhailovich, Russian 2nd Lubensky Regiment. 
   Skarzhinsky, Ivan Mikhailovich (b. 1804)-Russian Lubensky regimental chorunzhiy.
   Skarzhinsky, Nikolai Georgievich (1849-1910) - Russian Major General.
   Skarzhinsky, Vasily Anastasievich - Russian Major General. 
   Skarzhinsky, Viktor Petrovich (1787-1861) - a participant in the Russian Patriotic War of 1812, commanded a squadron of his name, which he formed at his own expense, one of the richest landowners of the Kherson province
   Skarżyński, Piotr, Russian officer in the late 1600s.
   Skarżynski, Marcin-Lithuanian landowner in the 1600s.
   Skarżyński, Ksawery(Xavier), a Professor(1850) at St. Petersburg University.
   Skarżyński, Felix (1613) Captain of the Polish Crown Army
   Skarzhinsky, Anatoly Vladimirovich (1906-1945) Soviet World War Two Senior Major. Anatoly served in the 332nd Rifle Regiment, 241st Rifle Division.
   Skarzhinsky, Nikolay Vladimirovich (1910-1990) Soviet soldier who served in the Soviet Union's 327th anti-tank battalion, 253rd Infantry Division was awarded the military decorations "For Courage" and Order of Glory 3rd degree during World War Two.

See also

Bibliography
The Skarzhinsky family in the history of Southern Ukraine (mid-XVIII - early XX century) : [monograph] / O.M. Doroshenko ; Odessa. National. un-t them. I. I. Mechnikov, East. f-t, From. history of the Cossacks in the South of Ukraine of the Research Institute of the Cossacks of the Institute of History of Ukraine of the National Academy of Sciences of Ukraine. - Mykolaiv : Publishing house of Irina Gudym, 2011. - 164 p. : ill. - Bibliogr.: pp. 132-164. - ISBN 978-617-576-048-2

References

Polish-language surnames